The East London Cemetery and Crematorium are located in West Ham in the London Borough of Newham. It is owned and operated by the Dignity Funeral Group.

History

The cemetery was founded in 1871 and laid out in 1872 to meet the increasing demand from the eastern suburbs of London. The first interment was in August 1872 and the cemetery remains open. The cemetery covers  next to the Greenway and has two Gothic chapels built at the end of the 19th century that remain in use: a burial chapel dedicated to Church of St Michael and All Angels, and a non-denominational chapel for cremations.  A total of 244 Commonwealth service casualties from World War I and 132 from World War II are buried in this cemetery, in addition to three Dutch merchant seamen from the latter war.

Burials

Memorials

Disaster victims:
 Memorial to the 550 victims of the 1878  disaster.
 A further disaster, the Silvertown explosion of 1917, is commemorated in the grave of Andrea Angel, chemist at the Brunner Mond chemical works whose TNT plant exploded damaging up to 70,000 properties in the area, killing 73 people and causing over 400 casualties.

CWGC memorials:
 Stone kerb wall in Soldiers' and Sailors' Plot, listing 97 Commonwealth servicemen buried in it in World War I.
 Screen Wall memorial, close to main drive, listing Commonwealth servicemen of the same World War buried elsewhere in the cemetery, whose graves could not be marked by headstones.
 Collective Grave memorial panel listing service and civilian victims of World War II air raids buried within the grave.
 Screen Wall memorial listing Commonwealth service personnel of the latter war whose graves could not be marked by headstones.

Notable burials
 Michael Barrington (1924–1988), actor
 Christopher Blake (1949–2004), actor
 Robert Cawdron (1921–1997), actor
 Beryl Cooke (1906–2001), actress
 Sylvia Coleridge (1909–1986), actress
  Leslie Dwyer (1906–1986), actor
 William Dysart (1929–2001), actor
 Hilda Fenemore (1919–2004), actress
 McDonald Hobley (1917–1987), broadcaster
 Arthur Howard (1910–1995), actor
 Charles Lamb (1900–1989)
 Carl Hans Lody – the first person to be shot during World War I in the Tower of London as a spy is buried under his own black headstone. Ten other German spies shot in World War I are buried under a small memorial stone, about 150 yards from Lody's grave, next to a pathway
 Mollie Maureen (1904–1987), actress
 Michael Mellinger (1929–2004), actor
 Billy Milton (1905–1989), actor
 Blair Peach
 Harry Reeve
 Terry Spinks MBE, (1938–2012), Olympic Gold Medallist in boxing, 1956
 Tony Steedman (1927–2001), actor
 Elizabeth Stride (1843–1888), victim of Jack the Ripper
 Will Thorne
 Maurice Wagg (1840–1926), American Civil War Medal of Honor recipient
 Jack Warner
 Doris Waters
 Queenie Watts
 Doris Waters (1899–1978), singer

Cremation of notables
 Lilian Baylis, ashes scattered
 William Dysart

References

External links
 
 

Cemeteries in London
Parks and open spaces in the London Borough of Newham
1871 establishments in England
Crematoria in London
West Ham